Thomas Jewett "TJ" Goree (November 14, 1835 – March 5, 1905) was a  Confederate Captain in the First Corps, Army of Northern Virginia during the American Civil War. By the end of the war he was promoted to the rank of captain. He was one of Lt. General James Longstreet's most trusted aides.

Early life

Civil War service

Postbellum

The Goree Unit of the Texas Department of Criminal Justice, was named in honor of TJ Goree in 1935. The unit houses the state's Sex Offender Treatment Program and U.S. Immigration and Customs Enforcement Processing Center for the Texas Department of Criminal Justice. The unit is accredited by the American Correctional Association.

Death

In popular media
Goree was portrayed by Ivan Kane in Gettysburg, the 1993 film version of Michael Shaara's The Killer Angels.

References

External links

Book Sources

 Michael, Shaara, The Killer Angels, The Random House Publishing Group, 1974, .
 Goree, Thomas, Longstreet's Aide: The Civil War Letters of Major Thomas J. Goree, University Press of Virginia, June 1995, .

1835 births
1905 deaths
People of Texas in the American Civil War
Confederate States Army officers
People from Marion, Alabama
People from Huntsville, Texas
Baylor University alumni
Deaths from pneumonia in Texas
Military personnel from Texas